Lemonweir is an unincorporated community located in the town of Lemonweir, Juneau County, Wisconsin, United States. Known locally as "Lemonweir Mills," it was once an important mill settlement on the Lemonweir River, as the name suggests. It once rivaled Mauston in size and potential until the railroad bypassed it. Aside from a few houses, nothing now remains.

References

Unincorporated communities in Juneau County, Wisconsin
Unincorporated communities in Wisconsin